Feels So Good or Feel So Good may refer to:

Albums 
Feels So Good (Atomic Kitten album), 2002, or its title track
Feels So Good (Chuck Mangione album), 1977, or its title track (see below)
Feels So Good (Grover Washington, Jr. album), 1975, or the title track

Songs 
"Feels So Good" (composition), a 1978 instrumental by Chuck Mangione
"Feels So Good" (Mel B song)
"Feels So Good" (Xscape song)
"Feels So Good (Show Me Your Love)", a 1996 song by Lina Santiago
"It Feels So Good", a 1998 song by Sonique
"(It) Feels So Good", a 2011 song by Steven Tyler
"Feels So Good", a song by 311 from Music
"Feels So Good" (Armin van Buuren song)
"Feels So Good", a 2001 song by B-15 Project
"Feels So Good", a song by Brand Nubian from One for All
"Feels So Good", a song by Kylie Minogue from Kiss Me Once
"Feels So Good", a song by Van Halen from OU812
"Feel So Good", a 1997 song by Mase
"Feel So Good", a 1955 song by Shirley & Lee, later a hit for Johnny Preston as "Feel So Fine"
"Feel So Good", a song by Ashanti from Chapter II
"Feel So Good", a song by B.A.P from Carnival
"Feel So Good", a song by Christine and the Queens from Chris
"Feel So Good", a song by Jamiroquai from A Funk Odyssey
"Feel So Good", a song by Jefferson Airplane from Bark

See also
Feel Good (disambiguation)
Feeling Good (disambiguation)